Elizabeth Aro (born 1961) is an Argentinean interdisciplinary artist from Buenos Aires. Aro uses fabric to create large-scale site-specific installations, and also uses photographs, drawings, and videos in her exhibitions. Many of her works relate to the perception of space and how individuals define home or where they are from.

Biography 
Aro attended the National School of Fine Arts Prilidiano Pueyrredón and the Universidad Nacional de las Artes (UNA), where she majored in art history. Aro was based in Spain for fifteen years and now lives and works in Milan, Italy, though she had been a resident artist at galleries throughout Europe. Many of her pieces are installations that change the narrative of the original work or change the viewer's perception of space. For example, she uses fabric to make roots appear to be going into the space, changing the viewer's perception. Aro's artwork, the "Red Net" series, was used as an example of her time as a migrant outside of Argentina, and to relate and connect to people who have lived in similar conditions. Aro has created many works relating to immigration and opened an exhibition in Spain that featured photographs of immigrants in streets. Much of Aro's work is focused on relationships to home and the effect of relocation upon a person. Aro finds the breaking of gender stereotypes to be important work. She wants to see a change in the view of women as submissive to men, and to break away from the cultural roles men and women often fall into.

Artworks

Danza Nocturna, 2022 
The installation consists of an old parachute and leaves made with precious jacquard velvet. Velvet is a symbol of luxury and elegance and the leaf shape that Aro gave to the velvet recalls the Amazon rainforest, they are majestic as nature must be, but the color used, black and gray, symbolizes climate change, recalling those images of environments devastated by recent ecological disasters. The heaviness of the dark velvet leaves, in contrast with the lightness of the parachute, create an effect of drama and disquiet. The artwork suggests that despite our indifference, Nature resists and continues to dance and she reminds us that despite the dark times, we too can continue to dance.

The fragility of hugs or Raíz de Luz, 2020 
Necklace, untreated natural bronze color, CAD design, prototyping with a 3D printer, hand-hammered surfaces alternating with glossy areas and engraved areas 24 × 15 cm.

Henry Clew's Cast, 2016
In this art piece, Aro adds brocade fabric to a sculpture by Henry Clew. Aro uses the fabric to make the male subject of the sculpture look to be holding a rope that leads to young children in the base of the sculpture. This art piece is meant to change the narrative of an extant art piece by adding to it in some impermanent way. Before the addition of the fabric, the sculpture had the young children reaching up to the man. With the addition of the fabric, it looks as though the main figure is offering a way for the children to ride up to him.

Santa Sangre, 2015
In this piece, Aro uses brocade fabric to create what appears to be reddish-brown roots coming out of a door. This gives the appearance of nature coming indoors and taking over the space. This can be seen through the size of the roots in relation to the size of the room. With the positioning of the fabric piece, it also appears as though the roots are continuing to grow and spread throughout the space.

Mundo, 2016
This piece, which is made of layered felt, is a large, white sphere that is meant to represent the world falling apart. The landmasses begin to fall south and merge together.

Estudio de Nubes, 2014-2015 
Th artwork, which consists of fifty-six pencil drawings of clouds, which the artist uses as a way to demonstrate time and memory. Each column follows one part of the sky as it changes. The artist finds time and memory to be an integral part of her life, and associates time and memory with her experience of moving from one country to another.

Ulivo, 2016 
The piece consists of brocade fabric and cotton sewn together. This art piece is a sculpture in the shape of a white tree. It is meant to symbolize life and the circle of life. The roots at the bottom of the piece symbolize the tree's connection to the underworld. The high-reaching branches demonstrate the tree's connection to the heavens or the celestial sphere. This art installation piece often dominates the space it occupies.

Exhibitions

Solo exhibitions 
2022 Memoria del Presente, Zaion Gallery, Biella, Italy   
2022 Danza Nocturna, for Artsite Fest, Principato di Lucedio, Italy
2022 Vincerà la Bellezza, Fantastik Lab, Valencia, Spain  
2022 Open Studio, Rèves, Citè Internationale Des Arts, Paris, France 
2021 Fiori e Fiamme, Babs Art Gallery, Milan, Italy 
2019 Dreaming in Red, Chateau La Napoule, Cannes, France
2018 Brumas, Nuova Galleria Morone, Milan, Italy
2018 Le Fil du Monde, Fondazione Filatoio, Caraglio, Italy 
2017 Provisorio para Siempre, Galleria Canepaneri, Genoa, Italy 
2016 Mundo e Los Otros, Gagliardi e Domke, Turin, Italy
2015 Los Otros, Ex Chiesa di San Carpoforo, Academy of Brera, Milan, Italy
2015 Santa Sangre, Moritzkirche, Ausgburg, Germany 
2013 La trilogia Esistenziale, Galleria Gagliardi e Domke, Turin, Italy
2013 Rehenes-Ostaggi Sala Santa Rita, Rome, Italy
2012 All Fires, The Fire, Pasajist, Istanbul, Turkey
2005 Espacio Uno, Centro de Arte Reina Sofia, Madrid, Spain
2003 Quien te ha invitado a esta fiesta?, Diana Lowenstein Fine Arts, Miami, USA
2002 Elizabeth Aro. Spazio Erasmus Brera, Milan, Italy
2001 De la Gente y el Paisaje, Casa Rivadavia, Cadiz, Spain
2000 Instituto de America de Santa Fe, Granada, Spain
1999 Galeria Arteara, Madrid, Spain
1998 Jacob Carpio - Atma Gallery, San José, Costa Rica

Group exhibitions 
2022 Bicocca SuperLab, Milan, Italy
2019 BienNolo, Milan, Italy
2019 Second Biennale of Mountados, Tynos, Greek
2017 Sequela, Ex Chiesa San Mattia, Bologna, Italy
2016 Biennale Internationale, Casablanca, Morocco
2015 Zoom – Fotografia Italiana, Fondazione Remotti, Camogli, Italy
2015 Kunst/Stoff Tim Museum, Germany
2006 Take me with you, Mori Museum Japan
2006 La donna oggeto Castello de Vigevano, Italy
2005 Generation of arts, Chiesa de San Francesco Como , Italy
2002 I filo raccontato, Museo de Trento y Rovereto, Italy
2002 Feria de Bologna, Spazio Erasmus Brera, Milan, Italy
2002 Artistas de la Galeria, escritorio de Arte Rosa Barbosa, São Paulo, Brazil
2002 Amantes, comisariado por Lorenzo Taiuti, Care of, Milan, Italy
2001 Italian Connection, Kunthaus Berna, Switzerland
2001 Arco 2001, Diana Lowenstein Fine Arts, Madrid, Spain
2001 Kunst Koln Fair Colonia, Galeria Antoni Pinyol, Colonia, Germany
2001 Miart 2001, studio Erasmus Brera, Milan, Italy
2001 Contemporary Photography, Diana Lowenstein Fine Arts, Miami, USA
2000 Artists' Presentation #4, Diana Lowenstein Fine Arts, Miami, USA
2000 Quello che non c'e, Curator Gabi Scardi, Spazio Erasmus Brera, Milan, Italy
2000 Ciclo de Autor: Guardando il tuo vestito, Museo de Arte Moderno, Buenos Aires, Argentina
2000 Domestico '00, residencia Privada, Madrid, Spain
2000 Project Room, Territorio Domestico Curador: Fernando Castro Florez
2000 Interart 00', Valencia, Spain
2000 Benvinguts a la sociatat del I'espectcle ACM Mataro, Barcelona, Spain
1999 Supermegadrops, Via Farini, Milan, Italy
1998 Fondation Argentine, Cité Internationale Universitaire de Paris, France
1997 La otra orilla, Casa de América, Madrid, Spain
1996 Argentinien Ursprünge und Erbe, traveling exhibition: Museum Giessen Galerie Am Fischmarkt Erfurt, Galerie Rähnnitzgasse der Landeshauptstadt Dresden, Museum für Völkerkunde Berlin-Dahlem, Germany
1991 La Escuela del Sur, el taller de Torres García y su legado,traveling exhibition: USA, Mexico, Spain

Residencies 

 2022 Cité International Des Arts, Paris, France  
 2020 Cité International Des Arts, Paris, France 
 2019 Foundation La Napoule, Mandelieu, Cannes, France 
 2018 Residenza Shared Lambrate, Officine Tamborrino, Italy 
 2016 Centre d'art Contemporain Ifitry, Essaouira, Morocco 
 2016 Foundation La Napoule, Mandeliu, France 
 2007 Fondation Australis, Rotterdam - The Netherlands 
 2002 El Paraiso es de los extranos. Arteleku, San Sebastián, Spain
 2000 Foundation Rodriguez Acosta, Granada, Spain
 1996 Fondazione Ratti, Como, Italy

Collections 
Galleria Arte Moderna Torino
Museum of Contemporary Art of Rosario
Museum of Modern Art of Buenos Aires

Bibliography 
 Redazione. TRINO. Al Principato di Lucedio Danza Nocturna e Figure infinite. 24 October 2022.
 ArtSiteFest. Elizabeth Aro
 Gallo Chiara. Fino al 6.I.2019 Elizabeth Aro Filatoio di Caraglio. 2018.
 Paolo Roggero. Elizabeth Aro: scolpire con ago e filo. 25 October 2018.
 Redazione. Le sculture in tessuto di Elizabeth Aro al Filatoio di Caraglio 26 ottobre. 19 October 2018.
 Paola Stoppina, I mondi onirici di matita e velluto di Elizabeth Aro, 23 April 2018.
 Bria Ginevra, Elizabeth Aro. Los Otros in San Carpoforo. 11 August 2015.

 “Los Otros” si incontrano a Brera. Elizabeth Aro porta in scene geografie del mondo e del cuore, partendo da sud. 2015.
 Redazione. Rehenes - Ostaggi di Elizabeth Aro e Silvia Levenson. 2013.
 Varone Patrizia. Elizabeth Aro. La memoria, l’equilibrio delle forme e l’altro. 2011.
 C’è anche Elizabeth Aro ad Artefiera. In galleria? No, nell’Exibart-stand… 25 January 2011.
 Mather, Frank Jewett. Sherman, Frederic Fairchild. Art in America, Volume 93, Issues 7-11 F.F. Sherman, 2005.
 Aro, Elizabeth, Elizabeth Aro: 10 de noviembre de 2004 al 2 de enero de 2005, Museo Nacional Centro de Arte Reina Sofía. Museo Nacional Centro de Arte Reina Sofía, 2004
 Paternosto, César. The Stone and the Thread: Andean Roots of Abstract Art., University of Texas Press, 1996

References

External links 

images of Aro's work on MutualArt

Living people
1961 births
Artists from Buenos Aires
Interdisciplinary artists
20th-century Argentine women artists
20th-century Argentine artists
21st-century Argentine women artists
21st-century Argentine artists
Universidad Nacional de las Artes alumni
Argentine contemporary artists